Elizabeth Ellen is an American author and editor living in Ann Arbor, Michigan.

She is the author of the collection of short stories Fast Machine, Before You She Was A Pitbull, poetry collection Bridget Fonda, and the novel Person/a. Her work has appeared in American Short Fiction, McSweeny's, and Muumuu House. She was awarded a Pushcart Prize for her story "Teen Culture," which appeared in American Short Fiction in 2012.

Ellen is the editor of Short Flight/Long Drive Books and an editor at Hobart.

Bibliography

Before You She Was A Pitbull – Future Tense, 2007 
Fast Machine – Short Flight/Long Drive Books, 2012 
Bridget Fonda – Dostoyevsky Wannabe, 2015 
Person/a – Short Flight/Long Drive Books, 2017 
Saul Stories – Short Flight/Long Drive Books, 2017 
Elizabeth Ellen – Short Flight/Long Drive Books, 2017 
Her Lesser Work – Short Flight/Long Drive Books, 2021
Exit, Carefully – Short Flight/Long Drive Books, 2021

References

External links
Official Website
Short Flight/Long Drive
Hobart

Alternative literature
American women short story writers
Living people
21st-century American women
1969 births